The Sri Lanka national cricket team toured Pakistan in October to November 1985 and played a three-match Test series against the Pakistan national cricket team. Pakistan won the Test series 2–0. Sri Lanka were captained by Duleep Mendis and Pakistan by Javed Miandad. In addition, the teams played a four-match Limited Overs International (LOI) series which Pakistan won 4–0.

Test series summary

1st Test

2nd Test

3rd Test

One Day Internationals (ODIs)

Pakistan won the Wills Series 4-0.

1st ODI

2nd ODI

3rd ODI

4th ODI

References

External links

1985 in Sri Lankan cricket
1985 in Pakistani cricket
1985
International cricket competitions from 1985–86 to 1988
Pakistani cricket seasons from 1970–71 to 1999–2000